Audition: A Memoir is a 2008 autobiography by American journalist and television personality Barbara Walters. The book was published on May 6, 2008, by Knopf. Audition provides a relatively full autobiography of Walters, spanning from her childhood to recent interviews. Walters discusses her work and personal life, confessing to an affair with Senator Edward W. Brooke and describing her relationship with Alan Greenspan.

The release of Audition was covered by major media outlets. Walters went on a promotional tour talking about the book, including an hour on The Oprah Winfrey Show and an interview with The New York Times. ABC broadcast an hour-long special hosted by Charlie Gibson on May 7, 2008, to celebrate the book's release. The special, called Audition: Barbara Walters’ Journey, attracted 7.4 million viewers.

References

External links
 Excerpt at Amazon.com

2008 non-fiction books
American memoirs